Jean Castilhon (11 September 1720 – 6 January 1799) was an 18th-century French journalist and writer.

Castilhon was one of the editors of the Nécrologe des hommes célèbres de France, from 1761 to 1782, at the Journal encyclopédique, from 1769 to 1793, the Journal de Trévoux, from 1774 to 1778, the Journal de jurisprudence of his brother Jean-Louis Castilhon, also a writer, and creator of the Spectateur français, ou Journal des mœurs in 1776.

Jean Castilhon was elected guardian of the Académie des Jeux floraux in 1751. A member of the Académie des sciences, inscriptions et belles-lettres de Toulouse, he became its permanent secretary in 1784. In 1798, he established a literary society, "Le Lycée de Toulouse", of which he was first president.

Publications 
1754: Amusements philosophiques et littéraires de deux amis, with Lancelot Turpin de Crissé. Read online
1769: Histoire de Robert le Diable, duc de Normandie, et de Richard sans Peur, son fils 
1770: Histoire de Fortunatus et de ses enfans 
1774: Anecdotes chinoises, japonoises, siamoises, tonquinoises, etc., dans lesquelles on s’est attaché principalement aux mœurs, usages, coutumes et religions de ces différents peuples de l’Asie
1775: Histoire de Pierre de Provence et de la Belle Maguelonne
1776: Le Spectateur français, ou Journal des mœurs 
1776: Histoire de Jean de Calais, sur de nouveaux mémoires 
1781: Précis historique de la vie de Marie-Thérèse, archiduchesse d’Autriche, impératrice douairière, reine de Hongrie et de Bohême
1783: Les Quatre Fils d’Aymon. Histoire héroïque
1783: Histoire de Richard sans Peur, duc de Normandie, fils de Robert le Diable. Pour servir de suite à celle de son père

Sources 
 Ferdinand Hoefer, Nouvelle Biographie générale, t. 9, Paris, Firmin-Didot, 1854, (p. 117).
 Axel Duboul, Les Deux Siècles de l’Académie des Jeux floraux, vol. 2, Édouard Privat, Toulouse, 1901, (p. 226–229).

18th-century French writers
18th-century French male writers
18th-century French journalists
Writers from Toulouse
1720 births
1799 deaths